Sinfonia Australis is an Australian early music ensemble founded by Antony Walker and Alison Johnston. They play on period instruments. They were founded alongside vocal ensemble Cantillation and the Orchestra of the Antipodes. Along with Gerard Willems received a nomination for the 2004 ARIA Award for Best Classical Album with their album Beethoven Complete Piano Concertos.

Sinfonia Australis often performs with the Pinchgut Opera and appear on many ABC Classics albums. Albums they appear on include David Hobson's Handel Arias and Shu-Cheen Yu's Lotus Moon, both ARIA nominees.

Discography
Shu-Cheen Yu, Sinfonia Australis, Antony Walker
Lotus Moon (2001) – ABC Classics
Willow Spirit Song: Folksongs of the Orient (2002) – ABC Classics
Cantillation, Sara Macliver, Teddy Tahu Rhodes, Sinfonia Australis, Antony Walker
Fauré: Requiem (2001) – ABC Classics
David Hobson, Sinfonia Australis, Cantillation, Antony Walker
Handel Arias (2002) – ABC Classics
Jane Sheldon, Cantillation, Sinfonia Australis
Song of the Angel (2003) – ABC Classics
Gerard Willems, Sinfonia Australis, Antony Walker
Beethoven Complete Piano Concertos (2003) – ABC Classics
David Hobson, Sinfonia Australis, Guy Noble
Cinema Paradiso (2004) – ABC Classics

References

Australian classical music groups
Early music groups